Veronica fruticans, the rock speedwell (a name it shares with other members of its genus) or woodystem speedwell (a common name that is hardly in common use), is a species of flowering plant in the family Plantaginaceae. It is native to nearly all countries in Europe, including the Faroe Islands and Iceland, and Greenland (which is floristically part of North America). It grows either in mountains in the south, or at lower elevations in colder areas in the north of its range. It is the official flower of the municipality of Bardu, Norway. It has been occasionally cultivated in rock and alpine gardens as a ground cover.

Notes

References

fruticans